Tummala Seetharama Murthy or Tummla Seetharama Murthy Choudary (1901–1990) was an Indian poet writing in Telugu.

Murthy was born in Kavuru village in the Guntur district of Andhra Pradesh. Works such as "Rashtragaanamu" reflect patriotism and the Indian independence struggle. He was honoured with the Sahitya Akademi Award in 1969 and with the title "Kalaaprapoorna" by Andhra University in 1969.

Early life and education
Sri Tummala Seetharama Murthy garu was born in Kavuru village in Cherukupalli Mandal of Guntur District, Andhra Pradesh. He was born on 1 December 1901 to Tummala Narayya and Chenchamamba. He completed his Ubhya Bhasha Praveena From Andhra University. He spent most of his career working as teacher. He taught Sanskrit for some time in Sanskrit School, Amrutaluru. He died on 21 March 1990 in Appikatla village of Guntur District.

Poetic style and works
He was initially into Bhava Kavitha Udyayam (Romanti Poetry), later he got inspired in to Humanism, finally into nationalism and struggle for Indian independence. Later he worked towards special Andhra state and Sarvodaya Movement as well. All these phases gets reflected in works. Tummala SitaRama Murthy advocated Gandhian philosophy.  He strived to write poetry in simple language free from complex Sanskrit. His literary works include
 "Rastra Ganamu" - Praising the history and glory of Rayalaseema
 "Mahatma Katha" - The independence movement and nationalism were popularised with Mahatma Gandhi as protagonist in his novel.
 "Sarvodaya Ganamau" - About Sarvodaya movement
 "Pariga Panta"
 "Paira Panta" 
 "Atmarpanamu"
He has 30 works to his credit

Accolades and recognition

 Sahitya Akademi Award in Telugu, in 1969 for his Poetry - Mahatma Katha
 Kalaprapoorna (Sahitya) title by Andhra University
 Abhinava Tikkana, Telugu lenka titles conferred by other organizations

References

1901 births
1990 deaths
Telugu poets
Recipients of the Sahitya Akademi Award in Telugu
Telugu people
20th-century Indian poets
People from Guntur district
Indian male poets
Poets from Andhra Pradesh
20th-century Indian male writers